Mula Cycling Team is an Indonesian UCI Continental cycling team established in 2017.

Team roster

Major results
2018
Stage 2 Tour de Ijen, Jamalidin Nouardianto
Stage 1 Tour de Singkarak, Jamalidin Nouardianto
2019
Stage 4 Ronda Pilipinas, Jamalidin Novardianto
Stage 2 Tour de Ijen, Aiman Cahyadi

References

External links

UCI Continental Teams (Asia)
Cycling teams established in 2017
Cycling teams based in Indonesia
2017 establishments in Indonesia